"My Type" is a song by American rapper Saweetie, released as a single on June 11, 2019, by Warner Records and Artistry Worldwide. It was first released as part of her 2019 EP Icy, and a music video was released for the track in July 2019. It was the basis of a social media challenge, and also became Saweetie's first entry on the US Billboard Hot 100, debuting at number 81 before peaking at 21. The song was written by Saweetie and produced by London on da Track, and samples the production of "Freek-a-Leek" by Petey Pablo, produced by Lil Jon.

Background
The track samples "Freek-a-Leek" by Petey Pablo. The sampled track earned Pablo, who took "Freek-a-Leek" to number 2 on Billboards Rhythmic Songs Chart in 2004, a second No. 1 as a songwriter on Rhythmic Songs overall (his first being Ciara's "Goodies", on which he provided featured vocals), while co-writer Lil Jon earned an eighth No. 1, and the song's co-writer Quavo his fifth on the same chart.

Music video
The music video was released on July 3, 2019, and directed by Daps. The video was filmed in San Leandro, California at Cherry Grove Park and San Leandro Adult School. It features Saweetie at a block party, rapping in front of drifting cars and twerking while standing on a basketball hoop. The video includes appearances by Kehlani and Kamaiyah.

Remixes
On August 23, a remix featuring Yung Miami of City Girls and Jhené Aiko was released.  On September 20, 2019, a Latin remix featuring Becky G and Melii was released. On October 25, 2019, a remix EP titled My Type (The Remixes) was released including the original song, both remixes, and remixes from Dillon Francis, French Montana, Wale, Tiwa Savage, and others.

Live performances 
At the 2019 BET Hip-Hop Awards, Saweetie performed "My Type" live alongside its "Freek-a-Leek" sampled artist Petey Pablo and producer Lil Jon.

Charts

Original version

Weekly charts

Remix

Year-end charts

Certifications

Release history

References

2019 singles
2019 songs
Songs written by Quavo
Crunk songs
Saweetie songs
Songs written by London on da Track
Songs written by Lil Jon
Songs written by Saweetie
Warner Records singles